Anton Edelmann (born 1952) is a cookery writer who was  at the Savoy Hotel in London, England, from 1982 to 2003.

Edelmann was born in Germany in 1952 and worked as an apprentice chef in a village near Munich.

He appeared as a castaway on the BBC Radio programme Desert Island Discs on 18 April 1993.

He has an English wife.

Bibliography

References 

Living people
British chefs
German emigrants to England
1952 births